Rives McBee (pronounced "Reeves") (born October 31, 1938) is an American professional golfer who played on the PGA Tour and the Senior PGA Tour.

Amateur career 
McBee was born in Denton, Texas, and has called nearby Irving home for most of his life. 

As an amateur he qualified for the 1966 U.S. Open at Olympic Club. He "startled the golf world" when he tied the U.S. Open record with a 65. He eventually finished T-13. It was his best performance at a major championship.

Professional career 
He played on the PGA Tour from 1966 to 1971, before accepting a job as the head golf professional at Las Colinas Country Club in Irving. He was a founding member of the Northern Texas Junior Golf Association, and a former Northern Texas PGA Teacher of the Year. McBee won the club pro's national title in 1973.

McBee competed on the Senior PGA Tour from 1989 to 1997, winning three times.

Professional wins (4)

Regular career wins (1)
1973 PGA Club Professional Championship

Senior PGA Tour wins (3)

U.S. national team appearances
Diamondhead Cup/PGA Cup: 1973 (winners), 1974 (winners), 1976 (winners), 1978

See also
1966 PGA Tour Qualifying School graduates

References

External links

American male golfers
PGA Tour golfers
PGA Tour Champions golfers
Golfers from Texas
Sportspeople from Denton, Texas
People from Irving, Texas
1938 births
Living people